Runhua Global Center 1 is a supertall skyscraper on hold in Changzhou, Jiangsu, China. Construction started in 2011.

Figures

See also
List of tallest buildings in China

References

Buildings and structures in Changzhou
Buildings and structures under construction in China
Skyscrapers in Jiangsu
Skyscraper office buildings in China